James Lloyd (1745–September 20, 1830) was an American politician.

Lloyd as born at Farley (now Fairlee) near Chestertown, Maryland. He pursued classical studies and studied law, was admitted to the bar, and commenced practice.  He was commissioned second lieutenant in the Kent County militia in 1776 and served during the American Revolutionary War.  He was a general in the War of 1812 and he freed captive Francis Scott Key from Fort McHenry.

Lloyd was elected as a Federalist to the United States Senate to fill the vacancy caused by the resignation of John Henry and served from December 8, 1797, until December 1, 1800, when he resigned. On June 27, 1798, Lloyd introduced the Sedition Act of 1798, a part of the Alien and Sedition Acts.

He engaged in the practice of law afterwards.  James Lloyd died at Ratclift Manor, near Easton, Maryland on September 20, 1830.  He was interred at Clover Fields, the estate of his daughter in Queen Anne's County, Maryland.

Notes

References

See also 

United States Army generals
Maryland militiamen in the American Revolution
United States senators from Maryland
People from Chestertown, Maryland
American people of Welsh descent
Maryland Federalists
Federalist Party United States senators
1745 births
1830 deaths
Lloyd family of Maryland